Jane Boleyn, Viscountess Rochford (née Jane Parker; c. 1505 – 13 February 1542), was an English noblewoman. Her husband, George Boleyn, Viscount Rochford, was the brother of Anne Boleyn, the second wife of King Henry VIII. Jane had been a member of the household of Henry's first wife, Catherine of Aragon. It is possible that she played a role in the verdicts against, and subsequent executions of, her husband and Anne Boleyn. She was later a lady-in-waiting to Henry's third and fourth wives, and then to his fifth wife, Catherine Howard, with whom she was executed.

Early life
Born Jane Parker, she was the daughter of Henry Parker, 10th Baron Morley, and Alice St John, great-granddaughter of Margaret Beauchamp of Bletso. Through Margaret, Jane was a distant relative of King Henry VIII — specifically his half-second-cousin – and this, in turn, made her a second cousin once removed of all of the King's children, including her niece-by-marriage, Elizabeth I. She was born in Norfolk around the year 1505; her family were wealthy, well-connected, politically active and respected members of the English upper class. Her father was an intellectual, with a great interest in culture and education. She was sent to Court in her early teens, certainly before her fifteenth birthday, where she joined the household of King Henry VIII's first wife, Catherine of Aragon. She is recorded as having accompanied the royal party on the state visit to France in 1520, "The Field of the Cloth of Gold".

Although it has long been supposed that nothing is recorded of Jane's appearance (and there is no surviving portrait that can be identified as her), her biographer Julia Fox, in Jane Boleyn: The Infamous Lady Rochford, suggests that there is a very remote chance that a Holbein painting represents a likeness of Jane (pp. 317–319). She was probably considered attractive in her day, given that she was chosen to appear as one of the lead actresses/dancers in the prestigious "Château Vert" masquerade at Court in 1522. The seven performers were selected from the ladies of court in large part for their attractiveness. Two of the other performers included Jane's future sisters-in-law, Anne and Mary Boleyn.

Marriage

In late 1524 or early 1525, she was married to George Boleyn (later Viscount Rochford), brother of Anne Boleyn, who later became the second queen of Henry VIII. At this stage, however, Anne was not completely attached to the King, although she was already one of the leaders of fashionable society.

As a wedding present, King Henry gave Jane and George a mansion, Grimston Manor in Norfolk. Since she gained the courtesy title of Viscountess Rochford by marriage in 1529, she was usually known at Court (and by subsequent historians) as "Lady Rochford". As the Boleyn family's wealth and influence increased, the couple were given the Palace of Beaulieu in Essex as their chief residence, which George and Jane decorated with a lavish chapel, a tennis court, a bathroom with hot-and-cold running water, imported carpets, mahogany furniture and their own large collection of silverware. Their marital bed was draped in cloth of gold with a white satin canopy, linen quilts and a yellow counterpane. Beaulieu had initially belonged to the Boleyns as one of their country retreats before they sold it to the King, who spent over £17,000 lavishly refurbishing and expanding it. In the early 1530s, it became the main residence of his eldest daughter, Mary, but when she was disgraced and banished to Hatfield House, George Boleyn was given the palace to live in, although the deeds were never formally signed over.

The marriage of Jane and George made her sister-in-law to the Queen Consort as well as aunt to the Princess Elizabeth, future Elizabeth I.

Traditionally, George and Jane's marriage has been portrayed as an unhappy one. One modern historian has suggested that George was homosexual. British historian Alison Weir concludes that the marriage was unhappy, principally because of George, although she concludes that the exact nature of his sexuality is difficult to ascertain: "[A] talented young man ... he was very good-looking and very promiscuous. In fact, according to George Cavendish, he lived in 'bestial' fashion, forcing widows, deflowering virgins ... [and] it has been suggested he indulged in homosexual activity too, but there is no evidence for this, although he may well have committed buggery with female partners." Julia Fox, Jane's most recent biographer, disagrees with both arguments, concluding that the exact nature of the marriage is unclear but suggesting that it was by no means unhappy.

The exact nature of her relationship with her royal sister-in-law is not clear either, and there is no evidence as to what she thought of her other sister-in-law, Mary Boleyn, who had been at court with Jane since they were both teenagers. It is generally assumed that Jane was not overly fond of Anne, allegedly because of Jane's jealousy of her. Regardless, Jane plotted with Anne to banish one of the King's young unnamed mistresses from court in 1534. When the King discovered her involvement, Lady Rochford was herself exiled for a few months.

Role in husband's execution
After 11 years of marriage, George Boleyn was arrested in May 1536 and imprisoned in the Tower of London, accused of having had sexual intercourse with his sister, the Queen. Elizabeth Somerset, Countess of Worcester, is said by contemporaries to have provided the evidence against the Queen and her brother. There was no truth in these rumours, according to the vast majority of contemporary witnesses, but they provided the legal pretext that the Boleyns' enemies needed to bring about the execution of Lord Rochford. Jane was mentioned only once during the trials, when George Boleyn was asked if the Queen had relayed information about Henry's sexual troubles to her.

The first mention of any tensions between Jane and her husband came long after their deaths, when George Wyatt called her "wicked wife, accuser of her own husband, even to the seeking of his own blood," in his biography of Queen Anne, but this view would have been informed by the disastrous Catherine Howard episode, when both she and the queen were executed for treason, and Wyatt's own attempts to exonerate the late Queen. Subsequent generations of historians also believed that Jane's testimony against her husband and sister-in-law in 1536 was motivated by spite rather than any actual belief in their guilt, hence her generally unfavourable historical reputation. A century later, an historian asserted that Jane had testified against them because of her "inveterate hatred" of Queen Anne, which sprang from jealousy at Anne's superior social skills and George's preference for his sister's company to that of his wife. This assertion is not consistent with the records of the period; not only is there no mention of any serious rift between the couple (and the few mentions of their marriage imply at least a tolerable relationship), but by the death of Jane Seymour, Jane had already rebuilt her reputation at court and been one of the Queen's chief mourners (she would go to serve two more of Henry's queens). Georgian and Victorian histories pointed to Jane's execution in 1542 to suggest that moral justice had triumphed because "the infamous Lady Rochford ... justly deserved her fate for the concern which she had in bringing Anne Boleyn, as well as her own husband, to the block". This view of Jane as accuser, despite lacking historicity, gained traction after her death, and was popularized by subsequent historians.

This negative view of Jane was rejected nearly 500 years later by her biographer, Julia Fox, who believes that Jane actually enjoyed a warm and supportive relationship with Queen Anne and that terror of the palace coup against the Boleyns in 1536 provoked Jane's testimony, which in any case was twisted by the family's enemies. In her 2007 book, Fox writes:

Widowhood
George Boleyn was beheaded on Tower Hill on 17 May 1536 before a large crowd. His final speech was chiefly concerned with promoting his new-found Protestant faith. Four other men, one of them a commoner, were executed alongside him, also accused of having been Anne's lovers. Only the commoner, Mark Smeaton, a musician, had confessed, and it was reported that he had been savagely tortured into doing so. (Members of the aristocracy and gentry could not legally be tortured.) Anne was executed two days later, beheaded by a French swordsman, within the walls of the Tower of London. Anne's poise and courage at the scaffold were much commented upon, and public opinion in the weeks and months after often "made of Anne a persecuted heroine, bright with promise and goodness as a young woman, beautiful and elegant." It is not known whether Jane witnessed the execution of either her husband or her sister-in-law, but the posthumous sympathy Anne aroused in many meant that many of those linked to her fall were cast in the roles of villains. According to Julia Fox, this mindset explains how Jane's actions were construed as being those of a cruel and jealous intriguer.

The immediate aftermath of the fall of the Boleyns was hard for her, both socially and financially. The lands which the Boleyns had built up during Anne Boleyn's reign and over the previous four generations, including the titles Earl of Wiltshire and Earl of Ormond, were to pass through the male line only, and thus were lost to the family with George's death. Jane continued to use the courtesy title of Viscountess Rochford but without a son she could not benefit from what remained of the Boleyn family fortune. (Modern rumours that George Boleyn, Dean of Lichfield, a colourful character, was the child of Jane and George are now thought to be false.)

Later political intrigues

After her husband's execution, Lady Rochford was absent from court for several months. She spent this time securing her financial position by negotiations with her father-in-law, Sir Thomas Boleyn, but mainly with Thomas Cromwell, the king's chief minister. The Boleyns eventually allocated her the sizable annual pension of £100, precisely what they had given their eldest daughter Mary, when she had been widowed eight years earlier. It was much less than her previous income as sister-in-law to the queen-consort, but it was enough to keep her as a noblewoman, which was essential for her return to Court, something Jane worked doggedly for in 1536 and 1537. It is unknown when she returned to court, but she was a lady-in-waiting to Queen Jane Seymour, so she probably returned within a year of her husband's death. (Jane Seymour died soon after childbirth, within eighteen months of becoming Henry's wife.) As a viscountess, she was allowed to bring a number of her own servants with her, lodge in the palace, and be addressed as "Lady Rochford". Fine meals were provided for her every day from the budget of the queen's household.

Following Jane Seymour's death, the King subsequently married Anne of Cleves, a German princess recommended by Cromwell. However, Henry soon wanted to be rid of Anne, and sought an annulment. In July 1540, Lady Rochford testified that the Queen had confided in her that the marriage had never been consummated. This allowed the king to annul the marriage and marry his teenaged mistress, Catherine Howard.

Lady Rochford kept her post as lady-in-waiting to the new Queen Catherine. Queen Catherine's past indiscretions were uncovered in the autumn, and her private life was investigated.

The Queen was first detained in her apartments and then placed under house arrest at Syon Abbey, a disused convent. Her confidantes and favourites were questioned and their rooms searched. Lady Rochford was herself detained for questioning, implicated in arranging meetings between the Queen and Thomas Culpeper.

Downfall and execution

During her imprisonment in the Tower, Lady Rochford was interrogated for many months but was not tortured. However, she seems to have suffered a full nervous breakdown and by the beginning of 1542 was pronounced insane. Her "fits of frenzy" meant that legally she could not stand trial for her role in facilitating the queen's adultery, but since he was determined to have her punished, the King implemented a law which allowed the execution of the insane for high treason. Jane was thus condemned to death by an Act of Attainder, and the execution date was set for 13 February 1542, the same day as Catherine Howard.

The Queen died first, apparently in a weak physical state, although she was not hysterical. Jane was then escorted from her lodgings to the scaffold where she spoke before kneeling on the just-used scaffold. Despite her nervous collapse over the previous five months, she was calm and dignified and both women won mild posthumous approval for their behaviour. One eyewitness, a merchant named Ottwell Johnson, wrote that their 'souls [must] be with God, for they made the most godly and Christian end.' The French ambassador Marillac merely stated that Jane gave a 'long discourse'; Johnson says that she apologised for her 'many sins', but neither man's account supports the later legend that she spoke at length about her late husband or sister-in-law. According to Alison Weir, Catherine Howard was not much more than 20 at the time of her death and Boleyn was about 36.

She was beheaded with a single blow of the axe and was buried in the Tower of London alongside Catherine Howard, close to the bodies of Anne Boleyn and George Boleyn.

In fiction and media
Lady Rochford has appeared in numerous novels, especially those on Anne Boleyn and Catherine Howard. As noted earlier, Vengeance Is Mine by Brandy Purdy is written from Lady Rochford's viewpoint. She also features in Robin Maxwell's The Secret Diary of Anne Boleyn, Suzannah Dunn's The Queen of Subtleties and briefly in Margaret George's The Autobiography of Henry VIII. Jane's character is also mentioned in Wendy J. Dunn's Dear Heart, How Like You This? which is based on the life of the poet Thomas Wyatt. Rochford is a minor character in Sovereign, the third instalment of C. J. Sansom's Shardlake series of murder mystery novels, set in 16th century England. A larger role is given to Lady Rochford in Jean Plaidy's novel The Rose Without a Thorn. Jane Rochford also appears in the Thomas Cromwell trilogy by Hilary Mantel.

Jane appears in the historical novel The Other Boleyn Girl by Philippa Gregory, which tells the story of her other sister-in-law, Mary Boleyn. One of its sequels is The Boleyn Inheritance, which casts Lady Rochford as one of its lead characters and its central villain. It details the final three years of her life and her involvement with Anne of Cleves and Catherine Howard. The Raven's Widow by Adrienne Dillard, takes a much different tack than previous portrayals. Lady Rochford is liberated from the entrenched version of villainess and shown as a beloved wife and close friend to the Boleyns. Her later role in the relationship between Catherine Howard and Thomas Culpeper coming about because of the trauma of her husband's death and the knowledge that disobedience comes at a price.

In some modern novels, Jane's vicious resentment of Anne leads to her psychological disintegration - she is portrayed as being mentally deranged and obsessively jealous in Vengeance is Mine and almost sociopathically amoral in The Boleyn Inheritance.
In both, she is also presented as sexually voyeuristic and given to petty spying.

In the 1970 BBC series The Six Wives of Henry VIII starring Keith Michell as Henry, Sheila Burrell portrayed Lady Rochford in several segments throughout the programme, primarily in the segments concerning Anne Boleyn and Catherine Howard. In the 2003 British 2-part television drama Henry VIII, Lady Rochford was played by Kelly Hunter. She appeared opposite Helena Bonham Carter as Anne Boleyn, Ray Winstone as Henry VIII and Emily Blunt as Catherine Howard. In the film adaptation of Philippa Gregory's novel The Other Boleyn Girl, Jane Boleyn (played by Juno Temple) was a minor character. In both these representations, Jane was shown as being a political tool in the hands of her husband's uncle, the Duke of Norfolk, although the presentation of her in The Other Boleyn Girl was more sympathetic.

Jane is also represented on seasons two to four of the Showtime series The Tudors, by Joanne King opposite Padraic Delaney as her husband George. In this version, their marriage is miserable, with both pressured into it by their parents and Jane finding it increasingly humiliating to put up with her husband's love affair with Mark Smeaton. They are shown frequently arguing and there is one incident of marital rape, which has no factual basis. However, Jane is not shown as hating Anne and so her betrayal of the Boleyns is motivated by her hatred of George. She befriends Jane Seymour when she is queen and is made her lady-in-waiting and remains a close friend until Queen Jane's death. She remains chief lady-in-waiting to Anne of Cleves and Catherine Howard. She eventually enters into a sexual relationship with Thomas Culpeper (a detail invented for the series). She is responsible for instigating the affair between Culpeper and Catherine, motivated both by a desire to keep Culpeper (who has a pathological obsession with the young queen) and out of a hatred for Catherine, whom she sees as grossly inferior to Jane Seymour and even Anne of Cleves.

In Wolf Hall, a TV mini-series adaptation of the historical novel by Hilary Mantel, she was played by Jessica Raine.

Notes

References

 
 
  

 
 
 
 
 
 
 
 
 
 
 

 

Rochford
Executed people from Norfolk
Executions at the Tower of London
Prisoners in the Tower of London
1500s births
1542 deaths
Executed English women
Ladies of the Privy Chamber
16th-century English women
16th-century English nobility
People executed under the Tudors for treason against England
Jane
Jane
People executed by Tudor England by decapitation
People executed under Henry VIII
Daughters of barons
Burials at the Church of St Peter ad Vincula
Household of Jane Seymour
Household of Anne of Cleves
Household of Catherine Howard